Psychonavigation 5 is a collaborative album by Bill Laswell and Pete Namlook, released on March 13, 2002 by FAX +49-69/450464.

Track listing

Personnel 
Adapted from the Psychonavigation 5 liner notes.
Bill Laswell – bass guitar, drum programming, electronics
Pete Namlook – electronics, synthesizer, trautonium, producer
Andre Ruello – cover art

Release history

References

External links 
 Psychonavigation 5 at Bandcamp
 

2002 albums
Collaborative albums
Bill Laswell albums
Pete Namlook albums
FAX +49-69/450464 albums
Albums produced by Pete Namlook